Cyprus competed at the 1988 Summer Olympics in Seoul, South Korea.

Competitors
The following is the list of number of competitors in the Games.

Results by event

Athletics
Men's 800 metres:
 Spyros Spyrou — Round 1: 3:34:32, Semifinals: 3:43.49

Men's 1500 metres:
 Spyros Spyrou — Round 1:  1:49.84

Men's triple jump:
 Marios Hadjiandreou — Preliminary: 15.95 metres (did not advance)

Women's long jump:
 Maria Lambrou Teloni — Preliminary: 6.29 metres (did not advance)

Women's 3 000 metres:
 Andri Avraam — Round 1: 9:02.18 (did not advance)

Women's 10 000 metres:
 Andri Avraam — Preliminary: 32:59.30 min (did not advance)

Women's Marathon 
 Katerina Pratsi — did not finish (→ no ranking)

Judo
Men's Competition:
 Michalis Skouroumounis
 Elias Ioannou

Sailing
Men's Double-Handed Dinghy (470)
 Christos Christoforou, Andreas Karapatakis - (27th place)

References

External links
Cyprus at the 1988 Summer Olympics by Cyprus Olympic Committee

Nations at the 1988 Summer Olympics
1988
Summer Olympics